Fateh Jang Gumbad Alwar, also known as Fateh Jang ka Gumabd or The tomb of Fateh Jang, is a popular tourist attraction located in Alwar city in Rajasthan state of India. The monument is dedicated to Fateh Jang, who was a minister to Mughal Emperor Shah Jahan and was a governor of Alwar, who died in 1647.

This historical tomb, located near the railway station and the tourist office has started losing its luster due to lack of maintenance. The upper part of the Fateh Jung dome is weak and can collapse at any time. Due to this, tourists coming here can also become victims of accidents. At present, the movement of tourists has been banned here.

History 
The tomb of Fateh Jang was constructed in the year 1647. Fateh Jang was a Pathan warrior and he was also related to the Khanzada rulers of Alwar, Rajasthan.

Architecture 
The tomb of Fateh Jang consists of five storeys among which three storeys are 60 feet in size, square shaped, and of the same breadth, with seven openings on each face of each of the three squared storeys, and have four beautiful octagonal minars at the four corners. The design of the tomb depicts the fusion of Mughal and Rajput architectural styles.

This tomb is an artistic marvel. It is an alluring blend of different styles of architecture. It is decorated by a huge dome, and the minarets enhancing its beauty. The walls and ceiling have plaster coating, and some fine Quranic inscriptions can be seen on the first floor.

This beautiful monument is maintained by the Archaeological Survey of India. There is a small garden surrounding the main structure of the tomb and some information about the history of this tomb is given on a sign board.

See also 
 Bala Quila also known Alwar fort is a fort in Alwar in Indian state of Rajasthan.
 Mehrangarh Fort covers an area of 1,200 acres (486 hectares) in Jodhpur, Rajasthan.
 Bhangarh Fort is a 16th-century fort built in the Rajasthan state of India.

External links

References 

Monuments and memorials in Rajasthan
Tourist attractions in Alwar